The Rhydd (formerly Rhydd Court) is an English country house alongside the River Severn, near the village of Hanley Castle, Worcestershire, about halfway between Malvern and the small town of Upton-upon-Severn. The house is now a care home.

History

The name Rhydd may have come from the colour red of the earth nearby. The house was built about 1800 and expanded in 1863. The architects were Richard Norman Shaw, David Brandon, and Charles Francis Hansom.

William the Conqueror gave the land to the Lechmere family soon after 1066. The Lechmere family kept the land from father to son to the 19th century, and from 1805 until 1915 it was the home of  Sir Anthony Lechmere, 1st Baronet, and Sir Edmund Hungerford Lechmere, 2nd Baronet.

From the 1970s to the 1990s, the complex was the campus of The Rhydd Court School, a facility for boys with behavioural and learning difficulties, run by the Malvern local government. Since 2005 the house has been a residential care home specialising in autism. Its extensive grounds, now independently owned, reach the right bank of the River Severn, and include walled gardens with a  greenhouse; they are occasionally open to the public.

People
Isabella Anne Allen lived at The Rhydd in the 1830s. In 2022 the Royal Horticultural Society found dried plants, poetry, drawings, and notes in an old book. Research showed that these were the work of Allen, who lived at ''The Rhydd'.

References

Further reading
 

Buildings and structures in England
Parks in the United Kingdom